Vadim Evgenievich Lashkaryov (October 7, 1903 – December 1, 1974), a prominent Soviet experimental physicist, was born in Kyiv, to a family of a lawyer. He was an Academician of the National Academy of Sciences of Ukraine and is known for his fundamental contributions to physics of semiconductors.

Career

Lashkaryov graduated from the Kiev Institute for People Education (as the Kiev University was termed at that time) in 1924. He started his research work on the diffraction of X-rays in the Kiev Polytechnic Institute and continued it in the newly established Institute of Physics of the Ukrainian Academy of Sciences. In 1928 he moved to Physical-Technical Institute in Leningrad (currently Ioffe Institute in St. Petersburg), where he performed first in the Soviet Union experiments on electron diffraction. After a forced stay in Archangelsk, where he taught physics in the local Medical Institute, Lashkaryov returned to Kiev in 1939, where he switched to physics of semiconductors.

In 1941 Lashkaryouv published his fundamental discovery, the presence of a semiconductor layer between the barrier layer and the adjacent electrode, and the opposite sign of charge carriers (electrons and holes) on both sides of a barrier layer in solar cells of Cu2O and silver sulphide photocells and selenium rectifiers. In current terms, this was a discovery of p–n junctions around the rectifying layers in these systems. This discovery was made by measuring the sign change of thermo-e.m.f. on both sides of the rectifying layer by using miniature thermoprobes. During World War II, Lashkaryov worked in the city of Ufa on cuprous-oxide devices for defense needs. After World War II, back in Kiev, Lashkaryov investigated bipolar diffusion of photo-carriers in cuprous oxide, photoconductivity of CdS and CdSe, and also on Ge diodes and transistors.

In 1960 Lashkaryov founded in Kiev the Institute of Semiconductors of the Ukrainian Academy of Sciences that currently carries his name. He also established a Chair in semiconductor physics in the Taras Shevchenko National University of Kiev.

See also
 p-n junction
 Photoconductivity
 Photodiode

References

External links
 Page of the V. Ye. Lashkaryov Institute of Semiconductor Physics of NAS of Ukraine, http://isp.kiev.ua/
 N. N. Bogolyubov, B. M. Vul, S. G. Kalashnikov, S. I. Pekar, É. I. Rashba, O. V. Snitko, K. B. Tolpygo and M. K. Sheinkman, Vadim Evgen'evich Lashkarev (obituary), Sov. Phys. Usp. 18, 842 (1975) doi:10.1070/PU1975v018n10ABEH005232, http://iopscience.iop.org/0038-5670/18/10/M07/

Experimental physicists
Soviet  physicists
20th-century Ukrainian physicists
1903 births
1974 deaths
Burials at Baikove Cemetery
Scientists from Kyiv